Lake Malombe is a lake in southern part of Malawi, on the Shire River, in the Southern Region. In recent years the number of fishermen on the lake rose substantially, and this led to local decline in some fish species, especially the chambo cichlids which is an important source of food throughout Malawi. The lake is extremely shallow with an average depth of approximately eight feet, and during periods of dry weather the water level recedes and can even disappear.

The lake-bed was dry for several hundred years until it refilled in the middle of the 19th century.

References 
 Community-based fisheries management, Lake Malombe
  

Malombe
Shire River
Geography of Southern Region, Malawi